Minamitaka Bridge is a bridge in Chūō, Tokyo, Japan.

External links
 

Bridges in Tokyo
Buildings and structures in Chūō, Tokyo